Lance Taylor (born 4 May 1952) is a former Australian rules footballer who played with St Kilda in the Victorian Football League (VFL).

Notes

External links 

Living people
1952 births
Australian rules footballers from Victoria (Australia)
St Kilda Football Club players
Oakleigh Football Club players